Farmer's Rest is a historic plantation property at 9341 Varina Road in Henrico County, Virginia.  The  property's farm complex includes a brick Greek Revival house, a smokehouse/workshop, chicken coop, and barn.  Other resources include the family cemetery of the Bullington family, early owners of the land, and the extensive archaeological remains of a former slave quarters.  The main house is a well-preserved example of Greek Revival architecture, having retained much of its interior woodwork, flooring and plaster.

The property was listed on the National Register of Historic Places in 1974.

See also
National Register of Historic Places listings in Henrico County, Virginia

References

Houses on the National Register of Historic Places in Virginia
Houses in Henrico County, Virginia
Greek Revival houses in Virginia
National Register of Historic Places in Henrico County, Virginia
Slave cabins and quarters in the United States